Father Is Being Stupid is a 1953 West German comedy film directed by Johannes Häussler and starring Otto Gebühr, Camilla Horn and Herbert Hübner.

Cast
 Otto Gebühr as Der alte Hannsen, Rennfahrer a.D.
 Camilla Horn as Baronin von Baran
 Herbert Hübner as Fabrikant Ewers, Lottchens Vater
 Claus Geißler as Wolfgang
 Florentine von Castell as Lottchen
 Ilse Fürstenberg as Frau Kirchner, Wolfgangs Mutter
 Hans Fidesser as Paul Bartels
 Kurt Vespermann as Kaminski
 Reinhold Brinkmann as Baron Koczy
 Klaus Günther Neumann as Rundfunkreporter
 Paul Mederow as Kriminalrat
 Claire Molzahn
 Nora Brand
 Reinhard Kolldehoff
 Wolfgang Gens
 Rudi Beil
 Erhard Ey-Steineck
 Die Schöneberger Sängerknaben as Kinderchor, Themselves
 Branko Berlan

References

Bibliography 
 Hans-Michael Bock and Tim Bergfelder. The Concise Cinegraph: An Encyclopedia of German Cinema. Berghahn Books, 2009.

External links 
 

1953 films
1953 comedy films
German comedy films
West German films
1950s German-language films
Films directed by Johannes Häussler
1950s German films